Dicronorhina derbyana, or Derby's flower beetle, is a sub-Saharan species of flower chafer.

Description

Dicronorhina derbyana is the smallest within the genus.

In Dicronorhina derbyana layardi the basic body colour is usually metallic green with an ochre sheen and white stripes on the pronotum and elytra. In D. d. conradsi the body is maroon with a blue sheen and tan stripes. It is completely metallic ginger to emerald green in Dicronorhina derbyana oberthueri. The males have a "T"-shaped, flat horn in the forehead. The larvae live in the soil on decaying vegetable material, while the adults feed primarily on tree sap and fruits. A female lays up to 200 eggs. The full life cycle will take 8–9 months, and the adult beetles can live 3–4 months.

Distribution
These attractive beetles are mainly present in Kenya, Tanzania, Zambia, Malawi, Namibia, Zimbabwe and South Africa.

Subspecies
 Dicronorhina derbyana carnifex Harold, 1878
 Dicronorhina derbyana conradsi (Kolbe, 1909)
 Dicronorhina derbyana derbyana Westwood, 1843
 Dicronorhina derbyana layardi (Péringuey, 1892)
 Dicronorhina derbyana lettowvorbecki Kriesche, 1920
 Dicronorhina derbyana oberthueri Deyrolle, 1876

Gallery

References

External links
 
 
 Photos of D. d. conradsi
 Photos of D. d. layardi
 Photos of D. d. oberthueri
 Flower Beetles
 Phasmids

Cetoniinae
Beetles described in 1843